The Winner is a 1996 film directed by Alex Cox and written by Wendy Riss based on her play A Darker Purpose. Most noted for its quirky cast (Vincent D'Onofrio, Richard Edson, Michael Madsen, Billy Bob Thornton, and Frank Whaley) and art department, including production designer Cecilia Montiel.

The film was substantially re-edited by its executive producers, Mark Damon and Rebecca De Mornay, and the original score – by Cox's longtime collaborators Pray for Rain – was replaced by a jazz score.  Cox requested that his name be removed from the credits.

Plot
Phillip is a naive nobody with an uncanny knack for winning in a casino. Not much caring if he wins or loses, Phillip goes on a weeks-long hot streak in Las Vegas that ultimately comes to the attention of a lot of people who want his money.

Lusting after it most is Louise, a lounge singer and con artist who seduces Phillip in the Liberace museum, then lies to him that she is $150,000 in debt from medical and funeral expenses for her parents.

Her ex-husband Wolf wants a piece of the action as well. He just happens to be Phillip's brother, and is lugging around the corpse of their own dead father. Louise's current boyfriend Jack is another interested party, as is a loan shark, Kingman, and a mob hit man, Joey, who's perfectly willing to shoot innocent bystanders in the casino if it'll get him what he wants. Phillip seems helpless against them, but there may be more to him than meets the eye.

Cast
 Rebecca De Mornay as Louise
 Vincent D'Onofrio as Phillip
 Richard Edson as Frankie
 Delroy Lindo as Kingman
 Michael Madsen as Wolf
 Billy Bob Thornton as Jack
 Frank Whaley as Joey

References

External links
The Winner at the Internet Movie Database

The Winner page on Alex Cox website

1996 films
Films directed by Alex Cox
1996 comedy films
1990s English-language films
British films based on plays
Films scored by Daniel Licht